The 2012 Clydesdale Bank 40 tournament was the third season of the ECB 40 limited overs cricket competition for the English and Welsh first-class counties. In addition to the 18 counties, Scotland and the Netherlands took part, as well as the Unicorns, a team of players who did not have first-class contracts.

The competition consisted of three groups of seven teams, from which the top team from each group, plus the best second-placed team, progressed to the semi-finals. The groups were allocated randomly.

Competition format

Group stage

Group A

Table

Results

Fixtures

Group B

Table

Results

Fixtures

Group C

Table

Results

Fixtures

Knockout stage

Semi-finals

Final

See also
ECB 40

References

External links
Tournament Site – Cricinfo

CB40
ECB 40
2012 in cricket